Christopher Hitchens (13 April 1949 – 15 December 2011) was a prolific English-American author, political journalist and literary critic. His books, essays, and journalistic career spanned more than four decades. Recognized as a public intellectual, he was a staple of talk shows and lecture circuits. Hitchens was a columnist and literary critic at The Atlantic, Vanity Fair, Slate, World Affairs, The Nation, Free Inquiry, and a variety of other media outlets.

Books

Sole author

 1984  Cyprus. Quartet. Revised editions as Hostage to History: Cyprus from the Ottomans to Kissinger, 1989 (Farrar, Straus & Giroux) and 1997 (Verso). 
 1987  Imperial Spoils: The Curious Case of the Elgin Marbles. Chatto and Windus (UK)/Hill and Wang (US, 1988) / 1997 UK Verso edition as The Elgin Marbles: Should They Be Returned to Greece? (with essays by Robert Browning and Graham Binns). Reissued and updated 2008 as The Parthenon Marbles: The Case for Reunification, Verso. 
 1990  Blood, Class, and Nostalgia: Anglo-American Ironies. Farrar, Straus & Giroux. Reissued 2004, with a new introduction, as Blood, Class and Empire: The Enduring Anglo-American Relationship, Nation Books, 
 1999 No One Left to Lie To: The Triangulations of William Jefferson Clinton. Verso. Reissued as No One Left to Lie To: The Values of the Worst Family in 2000. 
 2001 The Trial of Henry Kissinger. Verso. 
 2001 Letters to a Young Contrarian. Basic Books. 
 2002 Why Orwell Matters, Basic Books (US)/UK edition as Orwell's Victory, Allen Lane/Penguin Press. 
 2005 Thomas Jefferson: Author of America. Eminent Lives/Atlas Books/HarperCollins Publishers, 
 2006 Thomas Paine's "Rights of Man": A Biography. Books That Shook the World/Atlantic Books, 
 2007 God Is Not Great: How Religion Poisons Everything. Twelve/Hachette Book Group USA/Warner Books,  / Published in the UK as God Is Not Great: The Case Against Religion. Atlantic Books, 
 2010 Hitch-22 Some Confessions and Contradictions: A Memoir . Hachette Book Group.  (published by Allen and Unwin in Australia in May 2010 with the shorter title: Hitch-22. A Memoir.) 
 2012 Mortality. Atlantic.

Pamphlets
 1971 Karl Marx and The Paris Commune. Sidgwick & Jackson Ltd. 
 1990  The Monarchy: A Critique of Britain's Favourite Fetish. Chatto & Windus, 1990.
 1995 The Missionary Position: Mother Teresa in Theory and Practice. Verso.
 2003 A Long Short War: The Postponed Liberation of Iraq. Plume Books. Originally released as Regime Change (Penguin).
 2011 The Enemy. Amazon Digital Services.

Essays

 1988  Prepared for the Worst: Selected Essays and Minority Reports. Hill and Wang (US)/Chatto and Windus (UK).
 1993  For the Sake of Argument: Essays and Minority Reports. Verso, 
 2000 Unacknowledged Legislation: Writers in the Public Sphere. Verso
 2004 Love, Poverty, and War: Journeys and Essays. Thunder's Mouth, Nation Books, 
 2011 Arguably: Essays by Christopher Hitchens. Twelve. UK edition as Arguably: Selected Prose. Atlantic.
 2015 And Yet... Essays, Simon & Schuster.
 2021 A Hitch in Time: Writings from the London Review of Books, Atlantic Books,

Collaborations
 1976  Callaghan, The Road to Number Ten (with Peter Kellner). Cassell, 
 1988 Blaming the Victims: Spurious Scholarship and the Palestinian Question (contributor; co-editor with Edward Said). Verso, . Reissued, 2001.
 1994 When Borders Bleed: The Struggle of the Kurds (with Ed Kashi). Pantheon Books.
 1994 International Territory: The United Nations, 1945-1995 (with Adam Bartos). Verso.
 2000 Vanity Fair's Hollywood, Graydon Carter and David Friend (editors). Viking Studio.
 2019 The Four Horsemen: The Discussion that Sparked an Atheist Revolution, (with Richard Dawkins, Sam Harris, Daniel Dennett, and Stephen Fry). Bantam Press.

Co-author or co-editor
 2002 Left Hooks, Right Crosses: A Decade of Political Writing (co-editor, with Christopher Caldwell).
 2007 The Portable Atheist: Essential Readings for the Non-Believer. Perseus Publishing.  (editor)
 2008 Is Christianity Good for the World? – A Debate (co-author, with Douglas Wilson). Canon Press, .
 2008 Christopher Hitchens and His Critics: Terror, Iraq and the Left (co-author, with other contributions edited by Simon Cottee and Thomas Cushman ). New York University Press.
 2010 The Best American Essays 2010 (co-editor with Robert Atwan). Mariner Books.
 2011 Hitchens vs. Blair: Be it Resolved, Religion is a Force of Good in the World (co-author with Tony Blair). House of Anansi Press.

Contributor
 2005 Religion, Culture, and International Conflict: A Conversation, Michael Cromartie (editor). Rowman & Littlefield. 
 2005 A Matter of Principle: Humanitarian Arguments for War in Iraq, Thomas Cushman (editor). University of California Press, 
 2011 The Quotable Hitchens: From Alcohol to Zionism, Windsor Mann (editor). Da Capo Press.

Book introductions, forewords and prefaces
 1971  Karl Marx and the Paris Commune, Karl Marx and Friedrich Engels (authors). Introduction. Sidgwick & Jackson Ltd.
 1990 The False Prophet: Rabbi Meir Kahane - From FBI Informant to Knesset Member, Robert I. Friedman (author). Foreword. Faber and Faber.
 1992 Money for Old Rope, Charles Glass (author). Introduction. Picador.
 1992 The Greek Socialist Experiment - Papandreou's Greece 1981-1989, Theodore C. Kariotis (editor). Introduction. Pella.
 1994 When the Borders Bleed: The Struggle of the Kurds, Ed Kashi (author). Introduction. Pantheon.
 1996 Peace And Its Discontents: Essays on Palestine in the Middle East Peace Process, Edward Said (author). Preface. Vintage.
 1996 American Notes, Charles Dickens (author). Introduction. Modern Library.
 1997 In Our Time: The Chamberlain-Hitler Collusion, Clement Leibovitz and Alvin Finkel (authors). Foreword to Paperback Edition. Monthly Review Press.
 1997 Open Secrets: Israeli Foreign and Nuclear Policies' ', Israel Shahak (author), Pluto Press, London, . Foreword to paperback edition.
 1999 A Handbook on Hanging, Charles Duff (author). Introduction. New York Review of Books.
 2000 Scoop, Evelyn Waugh (author). Introduction. Penguin Classics Edition.
 2000 Safe Area Goražde: The War in Eastern Bosnia 1992-1995, Joe Sacco (author). Foreword. Fantagraphics Books.
 2000 1968: War & Democracy, Eugene J. McCarthy (author). Foreword. Lone Oak Press.
 2000 Vanity Fair's Hollywood, Graydon Carter and David Friend (editors). Introduction. Viking Studio.
 2001 Kosovo: Background to a War, Stephen Schwartz (author). Foreword. Anthem Press.
 2001 The Mating Season, P. G. Wodehouse (author). Introduction. Penguin Classics Edition.
 2001 Orwell in Spain, George Orwell (author), Peter Davison (editor). Introduction. Penguin Classics Edition
 2002 Machinery of Death: The Reality of America's Death Penalty Regime, David R. Dow and Mark Dow (editors). Foreword. Routledge.
 2002 From Russia, With Love, Dr. No, and Goldfinger, Ian Fleming (author). Introduction. Penguin Classics Edition.
 2003 Animal Farm and 1984, George Orwell (author). Introduction. Houghton Mifflin Harcourt.
 2003 The Adventures of Augie March, Saul Bellow (author). Introduction. Penguin Group.
 2004 Orient Express, Graham Greene (author). Introduction. Penguin Classics Edition.
 2004 Hons and Rebels, Jessica Mitford (author). Introduction. New York Review of Books.
 2004 Brave New World, Aldous Huxley (author). Foreword. HarperCollins.
 2004 Choice: The Best of Reason, Nick Gillespie (editor). Foreword. BenBella Books.
 2005 House of the Spirits, Isabel Allende (author). Introduction. Everyman's Library.
 2007 Our Man in Havana, Graham Greene (author). Introduction. Penguin Classics Edition.
 2007 Black Lamb and Grey Falcon: A Journey Through Yugoslavia, Rebecca West (author). Introduction. Penguin Classics Edition.
 2008 Everyday Drinking: The Distilled Kingsley Amis, Kingsley Amis (author). Introduction. Bloomsbury USA.
 2008  God: The Failed Hypothesis- How Science Shows that God Does Not Exist, Victor J. Stenger (author). Foreword to Paperback Edition. New York: Prometheus Books.
 2008 Infidel, Ayaan Hirsi Ali (author). Introduction to Paperback Edition. Simon and Schuster.
 2009 First in Peace: How George Washington Set the Course for America, Conor Cruise O'Brien (author). Introduction. Da Capo Press.
 2009 Ancient Gonzo Wisdom: Interviews with Hunter S. Thompson, Anita Thompson (editor). Introduction to Paperback Edition. Da Capo Press.
 2009 Certitude: A Profusely Illustrated Guide to Blockheads and Bullheads, Past and Present, Adam Begley (author), Edward Sorel (Illustrator). Introduction. Crown Archetype.
 2010 The Three Hostages, John Buchan (author). Introduction. Polygon.
 2010 Against Religion: The Atheist Writings of H.P. Lovecraft, H.P. Lovecraft (author), S. T. Joshi (editor). Foreword. Sporting Gentlemen.
 2010 The Sixties: Diaries:1960-1969, Christopher Isherwood (author). Foreword. Harper.
 2010 Civilization and Its Discontents, Sigmund Freud (author). Introduction. Norton, W. W. & Company, Inc.
 2012 Diaries, George Orwell (author). Introduction. Liverlight.

Book reviews

 Dedicatee 
Books dedicated to Hitchens:
 Richard Dawkins, Science in the Soul: Selected Writings of a Passionate Rationalist'', Bantam Press, 2017. "In memory of Christopher Hitchens".

References

Bibliographies of American writers
Bibliographies of British writers
Bibliography
Journalism bibliographies